The NCAA Division III Field Hockey Championship is an annual single-elimination tournament conducted by the National Collegiate Athletic Association to determine the national champion of women's Division III collegiate field hockey in the United States. The tournament has been held every year since 1981.

The tournament also included teams from Division II between 1984 and 1991 due to a lack of programs in that division; the NCAA Division II Field Hockey Championship resumed in 1992.

The most successful team is The College of New Jersey, with 11 titles. Middlebury are the five-time defending champions, defeating Johns Hopkins in the 2022 final, 1–0 in overtime.

Format
Currently, 24 teams compete in each national championship tournament. The first three rounds are played at campus sites on the fields of higher-seeded teams. The semifinal and championship rounds are held at a pre-determined site. The 2017 finals were hosted in Louisville, Kentucky by the University of Louisville.

Champions

Summary

 Schools highlight in yellow have reclassified athletics from NCAA Division III.

See also
NCAA Division I Field Hockey Championship
NCAA Division II Field Hockey Championship
AIAW Intercollegiate Women's Field Hockey Champions
USA Field Hockey Hall of Fame

References

External links
NCAA Division III Field hockey

 
NCAA3
1981 establishments in the United States
Recurring sporting events established in 1981